is a Japanese footballer currently playing as a midfielder for Vegalta Sendai.

Career statistics

Club
.

Notes

Honours 
Individual

 J.League Monthly MVP: 2022(May)

References

External links

1997 births
Living people
Japanese footballers
Association football midfielders
J1 League players
J2 League players
V-Varen Nagasaki players
Vegalta Sendai players